Foxy Lady is the eighth studio album by American singer-actress Cher, released in July 1972 by Kapp Records. Following the commercial success of the previous album Gypsies, Tramps & Thieves, Cher again collaborated with Snuff Garrett (producer), Al Capp (arrangements) and her then-husband Sonny Bono (co-producer). 
Foxy Lady was also the second and last record for Kapp.  The album was also promoted on Cher's successful The Sonny & Cher Comedy Hour show. 
After its release, it was well received by critics, but unlike her previous effort Gypsies, Tramps & Thieves, had only moderate chart and sales success.

Album information
When it was released, Foxy Lady was on the charts with two other Cher-related albums: Cher's Gypsies, Tramps & Thieves and Sonny & Cher's comeback album All I Ever Need Is You. This period was very successful for Cher, in which she established herself as a solo recording artist and also as a TV personality on (The Sonny & Cher Comedy Hour). During this period Snuff Garrett helped with Cher's records.

Foxy Lady was produced mainly by Garrett; Bono was a co-producer for only three tracks: "A Song for You", a remake of Cher's 1969 Atco single "The First Time", penned by Bono, and "Don't Hide Your Love", the last single released from the album.
These collaborations were so stress filled that Garrett resigned as producer after the album was finished. Bono then went on to produce Cher's next album Bittersweet White Light (MCA), which would be a commercial flop. Garrett was then approached to return to record Half-Breed; he accepted with the condition that Bono not be involved.

The opening track of the album is "Living in a House Divided", a song about divorce, but the album as a whole wasn't able to maintain the success of Cher's other early 1970s solo records. The album contains two covers, "A Song for You" and Hoyt Axton's "Never Been to Spain"; the latter had been a top-five hit in the US for rock band Three Dog Night before "The Way of Love".
 
On this album, Cher again collaborated with Bob Stone, who had previously written the song "Gypsys, Tramps & Thieves". Two songs from the album were also later covered by American singer Maureen McGovern for her 1973 debut album The Morning After.

In 1976, when Cher was busy with the Cher TV show, a line of dolls was released by Mego Corporation. One outfit was dedicated to the album. The Foxy Lady outfit is in two pieces, a pink metallic with an overlaid black lace. This outfit also includes a black cape. 
In 1993, Foxy Lady and Cher's 1971 album Cher were reissued onto one CD called Cher/Foxy Lady, which features all tracks from both albums. The original Foxy Lady album in its entirety remains unreleased on compact disc.

Critical reception

Foxy Lady received positive reviews from music critics. Joe Viglione of AllMusic said of the songs that "the other titles here display Cher's rich expression and the superb production work of Sonny Bono and Snuff Garrett.", and called Foxy Lady "an impressive collection of ten songs which holds up years later with more staying power than when it was first released." 
Rolling Stone praised the album saying that it "is dynamite work and will take her right up the charts once again" and described it as "a sure and speedy chart-topper for the "Foxy Lady"." 
Despite good sales of the first single, "Living in a House Divided", the album wasn't appreciated by the public, and unlike its predecessor, the record had limited success. The war between Garrett and Bono may have damaged the sales of the record.

Commercial performance
Foxy Lady debuted on the Billboard 200 at number one hundred twenty at the end of July, and after two weeks came in at #57. The highest position reached was at #43. 
The album also entered the Canadian Albums Chart and debuted at number seventy-five in late August, at a time when Sonny & Cher's album All I Ever Need Is You was also on the chart, and reached its highest position (#39) in September. 
The album remained in the chart for fourteen weeks and exited in late November.

Singles
"Living in a House Divided" was the first single released. It peaked in the US Billboard Hot 100 at #22 and in the Adult Contemporary chart at #2. It peaked in the Canadian Single Chart at #17. 
Shortly after, a second single was released, "Don't Hide Your Love", that entered the Billboard Hot 100 at #46.

Track listing

Personnel
Cher - lead vocals
Snuff Garrett - record producer
Sonny Bono - record producer on "Song for You", "The First Time" and "Don't Hide Your Love"; photography
Lenny Roberts - sound engineer
Al Capps - arrangement assistance
Gene Page - arrangement assistance
Michel Rubini - arrangement assistance
Virginia Clark - art director

Charts

References

1972 albums
Cher albums
Albums arranged by Gene Page
Albums produced by Snuff Garrett
Albums produced by Sonny Bono
MCA Records albums
Articles containing video clips